The McAllen Convention Center is a  multi-purpose convention center in McAllen, Texas, USA with a seating capacity of 3,500.  Having opened in 2007, it hosts locals sporting events and concerts.  It was home to the Continental Basketball Association's Rio Grande Valley Silverados, who played only one season in 2007-08 before leaving to become the Southeast Texas Mavericks.

External links
Venue website

American Basketball Association (2000–present) venues
Sports venues in Texas
Indoor arenas in Texas
Convention centers in Texas
Buildings and structures in McAllen, Texas
Buildings and structures in Hidalgo County, Texas
Continental Basketball Association venues